USS Boxer (LHD-4) is a  of the United States Navy. She is the sixth U.S. ship to bear the name of the original HMS Boxer, which was captured from the British during the War of 1812.

Construction and career

Boxer was constructed at Ingalls Shipbuilding, Pascagoula, Mississippi, launched 13 August 1993, and commissioned 11 February 1995. She immediately left for San Diego, California, via the Panama Canal. Although she had been designed to safely transit the canal, her bridge wing and other smaller components were sheared off in the transit.

Boxer also participated in RIMPAC the following year, then on 5 December 1998 deployed again to the Western Pacific.

Boxer deployed again to the Western Pacific, Persian Gulf and Red Sea on 14 March 2001 in support of Operation Southern Watch. She visited Singapore, Thailand, Guam, Jebel Ali, Bahrain, and Jordan, returning to the United States on 14 September 2001, just days after the attacks of 11 September 2001.

In 2003, as a result of the impending war and the need for troops in Iraq, Boxer found herself deploying yet again, this time six months ahead of schedule. This was a six-month deployment in direct support of Operation Iraqi Freedom.

She returned to the United States on 26 July 2003. Also in 2003 she won the Marjorie Sterrett Battleship Fund Award for the Pacific Fleet.

In another early deployment, to become known as a surge deployment, Boxer steamed alone from San Diego on 14 January 2004 to support the ongoing rebuilding efforts in Iraq, dubbed Operation Iraqi Freedom II. She delivered equipment and supplies to Kuwaiti Naval Base in the northern Persian Gulf for the continuing support of the post-war rebuilding of Iraq. She returned home on 29 April 2004.

Boxer was deployed with the 15th MEU from her San Diego port on 13 September 2006. They arrived to Iraq in November and returned to dock in San Diego on 31 May 2007.

From 20 April 2008 to 26 June 2008, Boxer conducted a humanitarian mission in Central and South America.

Anti-Piracy Task Force
Boxer is designated as the flagship of Combined Task Force 151, the international anti-piracy task force pursuing pirates off the coast of Somalia.

On 12 April 2009, Captain Phillips was freed during a US Navy assault in which three of the Somali pirates were killed, and one was captured. Captain Phillips was transported to Boxer for medical examination and rest.

Around 1 May 2009, Boxer assisted some 200 members of the German special operations unit GSG-9 in getting close to the hijacked German container ship . During the last phase of the operation, James L. Jones, the U.S. National Security Advisor, withheld final approval for the operation out of concern for the safety of the 25 sailors on board the vessel. This led to the decision by the German department of defense and the German department of the interior to abort the planned attack on the freighter for the time being and the GSG-9 unit, which is under the command of the German secretary of the interior, returned to their base of operations at the airport of Mombasa, Kenya. It was reported that the German department of defense influence and contacts to James Jones led to the U.S. decision to withdraw from the scene.

The ship returned to San Diego on 1 August 2009. During her transit of the Pacific, 69 of the sailors and marines aboard the ship contracted swine flu, forcing the cancellation of a planned "Tiger Cruise" from Hawaii to meet the ships for several hundred relatives and friends.

2010–present
The ship, with the 13th Marine Expeditionary Unit, departed San Diego on 22 February 2011 for a seven-month deployment in the Pacific and Indian Oceans.

On 16 June 2016, Boxer, supported by amphibious warfare ships  and  took part in Operation Inherent Resolve; AV-8BII Harriers of the 13th MEU flying off the ship began airstrikes against ISIL in Iraq and Syria, making it the first time the U.S. Navy used ship-based aircraft from both the Mediterranean and the Persian Gulf at the same time during the Operation (aircraft from the aircraft carrier  began airstrikes on ISIL targets from the Mediterranean on 3 June).

On 18 July 2019, President Donald Trump stated that the ship shot down and destroyed an Iranian drone over the Strait of Hormuz. According to a statement by the President, the drone was downed after "ignoring multiple stand down calls."

On 15 March 2020, it was reported that a sailor aboard, two days prior, had tested presumptive positive for SARS-CoV-2, the virus at the heart of the COVID-19 pandemic, marking the first case of a coronavirus case aboard an American warship.  The sailor subsequently quarantined at home.  A second sailor tested positive on 17 March 2020 and also quarantined at home.

On 7 April 2020, it was reported that BAE systems had been awarded a contract from the US Navy to perform extensive modernisation and maintenance to the USS Boxer, with work scheduled to commence in June 2020, and complete in around 18 months' time in December 2021. Notably, as a part of this work, the USS Boxer will be updated to be able to operate with the F-35 Joint Strike Fighter.

Deployments
 24 March 1997 – 24 September 1997  Maiden deployment
 5 December 1998 – 5 June 1999  West Pac-Indian Ocean-Persian Gulf 
 13 March 2001 – 14 September 2001 West Pac-Indian Ocean-Persian Gulf 
 17 January 2003 – 26 July 2003 West Pac-Indian Ocean-Persian Gulf 
 14 January 2004 – 29 April 2004 West Pac-Indian Ocean-Persian Gulf
 29 April 2005 – 14 September 2005 Western Pacific
 13 September 2006 – 31 May 2007 West Pac-Indian Ocean-Persian Gulf
 28 April 2008 – 26 June 2008 Eastern Pacific
 9 January 2009 – 1 August 2009 West Pac-Indian Ocean-Persian Gulf 
 22 February 2011 – 30 September 2011 West Pac-Indian Ocean-Persian Gulf
 23 August 2013 – 25 April 2014 West Pac-Indian Ocean-Persian Gulf
 12 February 2016 – 12 September 2016 West Pac-Indian Ocean-Persian Gulf
 1 May 2019 – 27 November 2019 West Pac-Indian Ocean-Persian Gulf

Awards
USS Boxer has been awarded the Navy Battle "E" numerous times;
 	
 1 January -  31 December 1995
 1 January -  31 December 1998
 1 January -  31 December 1999
 1 January -  31 December 2001
 1 January -  31 December 2003
 1 January -  31 December 2007
 1 January -  31 December 2011 	
 1 January -  31 December 2012
 1 January -  31 December 2013
 1 January -  31 December 2014
 1 January -  31 December 2015
 1 January -  31 December 2016
 1 January -  31 December 2017

2013 awards 
 Ship Safety (3rd)
 Engineering/Survivability (6th)
 Logistics Management (12th)
 Maritime Warfare Excellence Awards (19th)

References

External links

 

 

Wasp-class amphibious assault ships
Amphibious warfare vessels of the United States
Ships built in Pascagoula, Mississippi
1993 ships
Naval ships involved in the COVID-19 pandemic